Welsy Milena Vásquez López (born 17 September 1970 in San Pedro Sula) is a Honduran journalist and politician. She currently serves as deputy of the National Congress of Honduras representing the National Party of Honduras for Cortés.

She is well known in television for being reporter and anchor of the morning news program Desde Temprano from 1998 until 2008.

References

1970 births
Living people
People from San Pedro Sula
Honduran journalists
Honduran women journalists
Deputies of the National Congress of Honduras
National Party of Honduras politicians
21st-century Honduran women politicians
21st-century Honduran politicians
20th-century Honduran women politicians
20th-century Honduran politicians